Magid Mohamed (born 1 October 1985) is a Qatari footballer who plays as a midfielder for Al-Shamal. He previously played for Al Sadd and has been regularly called up for the Qatar national football team.

Identity controversy
In 2007, the Saudi FA lodged an official complaint against Qatar for fielding Magid in an Olympic qualifying match, who was thought to be ineligible due to his age. The complaint was based on the belief that Magid was born in November 1982, in Cairo, Egypt. According to the SFA, he was a Sudanese national who moved to Saudi Arabia with his father and studied in Omar bin Abdulaziz school in Jeddah - which is where the Saudi government obtained Majed's records from - before moving to Qatar and becoming a citizen. The complaint was made directly after a qualification match for the 2008 Summer Olympics, which Qatar had won. The rules of FIFA state that any player over the age of 23 cannot participate in the competition, whereas Magid was believed to be 25 at the time.

Shortly after, the Qatar Football Association released an article in response to the SFA's allegations. The article stated that Magid Mohamed Imam Salima was born in Khartoum, Sudan on August 17, 1985.  In contradiction to this statement indicating his age; his profile on the official QFA website, in addition to his passport, showed Magid's date of birth as October 1, 1985. To further add to the confusion, his name is most widely recognized as Magid Mohamed Hassan, as opposed to the former.

He was eventually cleared to play, and took part in the Olympic team's next match against Saudi Arabia, scoring Qatar's only goal of the match.

Club career statistics
Statistics accurate as of 21 August 2011

1Includes Emir of Qatar Cup.
2Includes Sheikh Jassem Cup.
3Includes AFC Champions League.

Goals for Senior National Team

References

External links 
Player profile - doha-2006.com

1985 births
Living people
Qatari footballers
Qatar international footballers
Sudanese footballers
2004 AFC Asian Cup players
2007 AFC Asian Cup players
2015 AFC Asian Cup players
Al-Sailiya SC players
Al Sadd SC players
Al Ahli SC (Doha) players
Al-Shamal SC players
Qatari people of Sudanese descent
Sudanese emigrants to Qatar
Naturalised citizens of Qatar
El Jaish SC players
Asian Games medalists in football
Footballers at the 2006 Asian Games
Qatar Stars League players
Qatari Second Division players
Asian Games gold medalists for Qatar
Association football forwards
Medalists at the 2006 Asian Games